František Richter (27 August 1931 - 27 March 2020) was an international speedway rider from Czechoslovakia.

Speedway career 
Richter reached the final of the Speedway World Team Cup in the 1960 Speedway World Team Cup. He was champion of Czechoslovakia in 1959 after winning the Czechoslovakian Championship.

World final appearances

World Team Cup
 1960 -  Gothenburg, Ullevi (with Jaroslav Machač / Luboš Tomíček Sr. / Antonín Kasper Sr. / Bohumír Bartoněk) - 3rd - 15pts (4)

References 

1931 births
2020 deaths
Czech speedway riders